Kathryn Christine Cammack (born February 16, 1988) is an American politician and political advisor serving as the U.S. representative for Florida's 3rd congressional district. A member of the Republican Party, Cammack previously served as deputy chief of staff to her predecessor, Representative Ted Yoho, who retired in 2020. She is the second-youngest woman newly elected to Congress in the 2020 election cycle, behind Democrat Sara Jacobs.

Early life and education
Cammack was born in Denver, Colorado, and raised on a 55-acre cattle ranch. When Cammack was a teenager, her mother spent time in jail for driving under the influence. In 2006, Cammack graduated from Douglas County High School in Castle Rock, Colorado. She earned a Bachelor of Arts degree in international relations from the Metropolitan State University of Denver and a Master of Science in national defense and strategic studies from the Naval War College. She has said she lived with her mother in an extended-stay motel for four months.

Cammack once claimed that her family was evicted from their cattle ranch "due to an Obama-era housing program"; in fact, the ranch was put up for sale because the family could not afford the mortgage payments.

Career
Cammack has said that her family's experience with the federal Home Affordable Modification Program in 2011 inspired her interest in politics. In 2009, she interned with U.S. Representative Mike Coffman. She later joined Ted Yoho's congressional campaign. After Yoho was elected, Cammack served as his deputy chief of staff from 2013 to 2019. In 2019, she left Yoho's office in Washington, D.C. and returned to Florida. Yoho did not seek reelection in 2020, fulfilling his pledge to serve only four terms. Cammack announced her candidacy for Yoho's seat in December 2019.

Cammack also operates an independent political consulting firm. After winning the primary, she was heavily favored to win the general election. In September 2020, Donald Trump endorsed her. After her primary win, Cammack established a leadership PAC.

Cammack ran for chair of the Republican Study Committee but later withdrew her bid for the position and endorsed Kevin Hern. She nominated Kevin McCarthy in the 2023 Speaker of the United States House of Representatives election.

U.S. House of Representatives

Elections

2020 

Cammack defeated Democratic nominee Adam Christensen. She assumed office on January 3, 2021.

2022 

Cammack ran for reelection. In the primary, she received 84.8% of the vote to her opponent Justin Waters's 15.2%. A third candidate, Manuel Asensio, dropped out before Election Day. Cammack won the general election with 62.5% of the vote to Democratic nominee Danielle Hawk's 36.3% and NPA Linda Brooks's 1.2%.

Caucus memberships 

 Republican Study Committee
 Campus Free Speech Caucus
 Congressional Pro-Life Caucus
During a speech on the House floor after the sixth failed attempt to elect Kevin McCarthy as House speaker on January 4, 2023, Cammack claimed without evidence that Democrats were drinking alcohol during the vote. She said, "diversity of thought is a good thing. But they want us divided. They want us to fight each other. That has been made clear by the popcorn and blankets and alcohol that is comin' over there". She reiterated the claim the next day on Fox News.

Political positions

2020 presidential election and storming of the U.S. Capitol 

Cammack was one of 139 representatives who voted on January 7, 2021, to overturn the results of the 2020 presidential election. On the House floor, she said the January 6 attacks "furthermore resolved" her objection to the certification process and that, as representatives of the people, members of Congress must stand for a free and fair election. Numerous inquiries have found no evidence that the election was unfree or unfair to an extent that changed its outcome.

Abortion 

Cammack is anti-abortion and co-chair of the Congressional Pro-Life Caucus. She believes states should determine their abortion laws, and abortion should be allowed only in extreme cases in the first trimester. In 2022, she cosponsored a bill to ban abortions nationwide past 15 weeks. During her campaign, she released an advertisement in which she said that, when her mother was pregnant with her, she was advised by doctors to have an abortion, but chose not to.

Congressional term limits 

In March 2020, Cammack signed the U.S. Term Limits pledge. She said that a "limit on the time an individual can serve brings new ideas to Capitol Hill."

Economy 

Cammack cosponsored a bill to expand federal home loans for first responders and educators. The bill, introduced in May 2021, has not passed out of committee.

Education 
Cammack has called U.S. college campuses "indoctrination camps" and claimed that conservative students are under attack.

Energy and environment 
Cammack cosponsored the PROTECT Florida Act to prohibit oil and gas drilling off the coast of Florida until 2032. The bill, introduced in October 2021, has not passed out of committee. On March 14, 2022, Cammack said the U.S. needs to produce more oil.

Firearms 

Cammack is a board member of the Alachua County Friends of the National Rifle Association. In 2020, the NRA endorsed her. In 2021, she voted for the National Defense Authorization Act, which contained red flag laws.

Cammack opposes background checks for gun purchases. On the House floor, she called background check legislation "gun-grabber bills".

Foreign affairs 

In June 2021, Cammack was one of 49 House Republicans to vote to repeal the AUMF against Iraq. She voted for the Ukraine Democracy Defense Lend-Lease Act of 2022.

In 2023, Cammack was among 47 Republicans to vote in favor of H.Con.Res. 21 which directed President Joe Biden to remove U.S. troops from Syria within 180 days.

Immigration and border security 

Cammack has supported the construction of a border wall along the Mexico–United States border.

On July 22, 2021, Cammack claimed on the House floor that NGOs transport undocumented migrants around the country at U.S. government expense.

During the 2022 United States infant formula shortage, Cammack criticized the Biden administration for sending baby formula to detention facilities on the U.S.-Mexico border. White House Press Secretary Jen Psaki said that under the Flores Settlement Agreement, the U.S. is required to provide adequate and age-appropriate food, "hence formula for kids under the age of 1." During an interview with Sean Hannity on Fox News, Cammack showed pictures of baby formula she said she had received from a CBP agent. Tommy Christopher wrote that some of the images used in Cammack's interview with Hannity were not of baby formula but of powdered milk for children older than one. Hannity later acknowledged on Twitter that two of the pictures he aired during Cammack's appearance were milk products for children over one.

Law enforcement

Cammack has said it is reassuring that the Capitol Police are expanding into Florida and will work with local law enforcement.

LGBT rights 
Cammack has called the Equality Act—a bill that would amend the Civil Rights Act of 1964 (including titles II, III, IV, VI, VII, and IX) to prohibit discrimination on the basis of sex, sexual orientation and gender identity in employment, housing, public accommodations, education, federally funded programs, credit, and jury service—a "farce" that will strip people of faith and private organizations of the right to decide for themselves how to live, work, and conduct business. She voted against the act and numerous other protections for LBGTQ Americans during her time in Congress. On July 19, 2022, Cammack and 46 other Republican representatives voted for the Respect for Marriage Act, which would repeal the Defense of Marriage Act and codify the right to same-sex marriage in federal law. Cammack wrote that she supported the bill because, under the Fourteenth Amendment, the law cannot treat one group of citizens differently from another.

Personal life
Cammack's husband, Matt Harrison, is a firefighter. Cammack is a Protestant.

See also
Women in the United States House of Representatives

References

External links

Representative Kat Cammack official U.S. House website
 Campaign website
 

|-

|-

 

1988 births
Female members of the United States House of Representatives
Living people
American Protestants
Metropolitan State University of Denver alumni
Naval War College alumni
People from Denver
People from Castle Rock, Colorado
Republican Party members of the United States House of Representatives from Florida
United States congressional aides
Women in Florida politics
Conservatism in the United States
Christians from Florida
21st-century American women